The Sleepwalker is a cartoon starring Mickey's dog Pluto. It was produced by Walt Disney Productions and released by RKO Radio Pictures in 1942. In the short, Pluto is enamored of Dinah the Dachsund, who also appears in Canine Casanova (1945), In Dutch (1946), Pluto's Heart Throb (1950) and Wonder Dog (1950).

Plot
Pluto is seen, happily sleeping while licking his bone. Dinah the Dachshund (in her first cartoon appearance), watching from a hole in a fence also wants the bone too, so she closes up and carefully pulls Pluto's bowl which contains the bone away from him and to herself. Pluto's tongue detects that the bone is gone before he wakes up and is shocked to see that Dinah is licking his bone. Furious, Pluto chases after Dinah through the neighbourhood starts sleepwalking and, while in this state, gives his bone to Dinah the Dachshund, but every time he wakes up, he cannot seem to understand how Dinah got a hold of his bone and wants it back.

Voice cast
 Pluto: Pinto Colvig

Releases
1942 – theatrical release
c. 1992 – Mickey's Mouse Tracks, episode #42 (TV)
c. 1992 – Donald's Quack Attack, episode #43 (TV)
1997 – The Ink and Paint Club, episode #1.12: "The Many Loves of Pluto" (TV)

Home media
The short was released on December 7, 2004, on Walt Disney Treasures: The Complete Pluto: 1930-1947.

Additional releases include:
1981 – "Mickey Mouse and Donald Duck Cartoon Collections Volume One" (VHS)

References

External links

1942 short films
1940s Disney animated short films
Pluto (Disney) short films
1942 animated films
Films directed by Clyde Geronimi
Films produced by Walt Disney
Films scored by Leigh Harline
RKO Pictures animated short films
Animated films without speech
American animated short films
Animated films about dogs